Edge-notched cards or edge-punched cards are a system used to store a small amount of binary or logical data on paper index cards, encoded via the presence or absence of notches in the edges of the cards. The notches allowed efficient sorting and selecting of specific cards matching multiple desired criteria, from a larger number of cards in a paper-based database of information. In the mid-20th century they were sold under names such as Cope-Chat cards, E-Z Sort cards, McBee Keysort cards, and Indecks cards. They are also informally called needle cards since they can be sorted with long knitting needles.

Overview

Edge-notched cards are a manual data storage and manipulation technology used for specialized data storage and cataloging applications through much of the 20th century. An early instance of something like this methodology appeared in 1904. While there were many variants, by the mid-20th century a popular version consisted of  paperboard cards with holes punched at regular intervals along all four edges, a short distance in from the edges. The center of the card might be blank space for information to be written, or contain a pre-printed form, or contain a microform image in the case of edge-notched aperture cards.

To record data, the paper stock between a hole and the nearest edge was removed by a special notching tool. The holes were assigned a meaning dependent upon a particular application. For example, one hole might record the answer to a yes/no question on a survey, with the presence of a notch meaning "yes". More-complex data was encoded using a variety of schemes, often using a superimposed code which allows more distinct categories to be coded than the number of holes available.

To allow a visual check that all cards in a deck were oriented the same way, one corner of each card was beveled, much like Hollerith punched cards. Edge-notched cards, however, were not intended to be read by machines such as IBM card sorters. Instead, they were manipulated by passing one or more slim needles through selected holes in a group of cards. As the needles were lifted, the cards that were notched in the hole positions where the needles were inserted would be left behind as rest of the deck was lifted by the needles. Using two or more needles produced a logical and function. Combining the cards from two different selections produced a logical or. Quite complex manipulations, including sorting were possible using these techniques.

Applications

Before the widespread use of computers, some public libraries used a system of small edge-notched cards in paper pockets in the back of library books to keep track of them. Edge-notched cards were used for course scheduling in some high schools and colleges during the same era.

The corporate library of a division of E. I. du Pont de Nemours and Company maintained a subject catalog on two-level edge-punched cards (Royal-McBee Keysort cards) that grew to 15,000 cards before the librarians began to consider keeping the catalog on a computer.

See also
Bucket sort
Hash value
Paper data storage
Radix sort
Tag (metadata)
Unit record equipment

Notes

References

 Edge-notched cards are mentioned in multiple chapters in this collection.
 An article that describes the use of microform images in edge-notched aperture cards.

 An article on edge-notched cards that mentions their use in the production of The Last Whole Earth Catalog in the 1970s, among other projects. Kelly observed that as a medium edge-notched cards were "dead", but some commenters on the article suggested otherwise.
 An article introducing McBee Keysort edge-notched cards for use in library circulation records. The author, a technology early adopter, later became a pioneer in library computerization.

Business documents
Ephemera
Storage media
Perforation-based computational tools